Litoria scabra is a species of frog in the subfamily Pelodryadinae. It is endemic to Western New Guinea (Indonesia).

Habitat and conservation
It lives in and near fast-flowing streams. While its known range is very limited, it lives in a region with large areas of suitable habitat that are not under significant threat.

References

scabra
Frogs of Asia
Amphibians of Western New Guinea
Endemic fauna of New Guinea
Endemic fauna of Indonesia
Amphibians described in 2005
Taxa named by Rainer Günther
Taxa named by Stephen J. Richards